Metreos was a software company that created and sold development and runtime tools for creating voice over Internet Protocol software applications. The company was founded by Louis Marascio and Mark Richards and was based in Austin, Texas, United States. On June 8, 2006 Cisco Systems announced it was acquiring Metreos for $28 million in cash. On June 30, 2006, the acquisition of Metreos by Cisco Systems was completed.

Funding
Metreos was backed by venture capital. The company completed two rounds of financing: a $550,000 seed round from Startech Early Ventures, in the form of convertible debt, that was completed in March 2003; and a $3.8 million Series A equity financing led by Hunt Ventures and Gefinor Ventures completed in October 2004.

References

Software companies based in Texas
Cisco Systems acquisitions
Companies based in Austin, Texas
Defunct software companies of the United States

2001 establishments in the United States
2001 establishments in Texas
Software companies established in 2001
Companies established in 2001